This is a list of airports in Seychelles, sorted by location.

Other nearby island countries and territories include Zanzibar to the west, Mauritius and Réunion to the south, Comoros and Mayotte to the southwest. The Seychelles has the smallest population of any African state.



Airports

See also 

 Transport in Seychelles
 List of airports by ICAO code: F#FS - Seychelles
 Wikipedia: WikiProject Aviation/Airline destination lists: Africa#Seychelles

References 
 
  - includes IATA codes
 Great Circle Mapper: Airports in Seychelles - IATA and ICAO codes
 World Aero Data: Airports in Seychelles - ICAO codes

Seychelles
 
Airports
Airports
Seychelles